Reginato is an Italian surname. Notable people with the surname include:

Adriano Reginato (born 1937), Italian footballer
Peter Reginato (born 1945), American sculptor and painter
Vic Reginato (1918–2000), American football player
Virginia Reginato (born 1939), Chilean politician

Italian-language surnames